Matt or Matthew Austin may refer to:
Matt Austin (actor) (born 1978), Canadian actor
Matt Austin (footballer) (born 1989), Brisbane Lions player